Wire Lock is a lock on the Kennet and Avon Canal, near Hungerford, Berkshire, England.

It is a grade II listed building.

References

See also

Locks on the Kennet and Avon Canal

Grade II listed buildings in Berkshire
Locks on the Kennet and Avon Canal
Locks of Berkshire
Kintbury